Marius Mircea Șuleap (born 11 September 1979) is a Romanian former footballer who played as a midfielder. In 2002, during a training session in Cyprus with Universitatea Craiova, Șuleap involuntarily hit the goalkeeper Cristian Neamțu's head with his knee, after which Neamțu went into a coma and died one week later in a hospital.

Honours
FC Baia Mare
Divizia C: 1999–2000
Rocar București
Cupa României runner-up: 2000–01
FC Baku
Azerbaijan League: 2005–06

Notes

References

External links
Marius Șuleap at Labtof.ro

1979 births
Living people
Romanian footballers
Association football midfielders
Liga I players
Liga II players
Super League Greece players
Azerbaijan Premier League players
CS Minaur Baia Mare (football) players
AFC Rocar București players
FC U Craiova 1948 players
FC Petrolul Ploiești players
FC Politehnica Timișoara players
FC Unirea Urziceni players
FC Gloria Buzău players
FC Botoșani players
Shamakhi FK players
FC Baku players
OFI Crete F.C. players
AS Voința Snagov players
Romanian expatriate footballers
Expatriate footballers in Greece
Expatriate sportspeople in Greece
Romanian expatriates in Greece
Romanian expatriate sportspeople in Greece
Expatriate footballers in Azerbaijan
Expatriate sportspeople in Azerbaijan
Romanian expatriate sportspeople in Azerbaijan
People from Dorohoi